Mineke is a Dutch female given name, Wilhelmina. Notable people with the name include:

 Mineke Bosch (born 1954), Dutch historian born in South Africa
 Mineke Schipper (born 1938), Dutch author of fiction and non-fiction

See also
 Meineke (disambiguation)